Darrell Kestner (born August 15, 1953) is an American professional golfer.

Early life 
Kestner was born in Welch, West Virginia. He attended Concord College.

Professional career 
He turned professional in 1975.

Kestner works as a club professional but did play on the PGA Tour in 1981 and 1983. His best finish was a T-30 at the 1981 Tallahassee Open.

Personal life 
Kestner lives in Glen Cove, New York.

Professional wins (22)

Tournament Players Series wins (1) 

Source:

Other wins (21)
1982 Footjoy PGA Assistant Professional Championship, Metropolitan Open
1983 Metropolitan Open
1987 PGA Assistant Professional Championship
1988 Westchester PGA Championship
1989 Westchester PGA Championship
1992 Long Island PGA Championship
1993 New York State Open
1994 Metropolitan PGA Championship, New York State Open
1995 Metropolitan Open, Metropolitan PGA Championship, Long Island Open
1996 PGA Assistant Professional Championship
1997 Metropolitan PGA Championship
2001 Long Island PGA Championship
2002 Long Island PGA Championship
2003 Metropolitan PGA Championship
2004 Metropolitan PGA Championship
2006 Long Island Open
2012 Long Island PGA Championship

Results in major championships

Note: Kestner only played in the U.S. Open and the PGA Championship.

CUT = missed the half way cut
"T" indicates a tie for a place.

U.S. national team appearances
PGA Cup: 1998 (winners)

See also 
Fall 1980 PGA Tour Qualifying School graduates
1982 PGA Tour Qualifying School graduates

References

External links

American male golfers
PGA Tour golfers
Golfers from West Virginia
Golfers from New York (state)
Concord University alumni
People from Welch, West Virginia
Sportspeople from Glen Cove, New York
1953 births
Living people